Hillar Eller (15 December 1939, Kärdla – 22 February 2010) was an Estonian former long distance runner and politician, most notable for being a voter for the Estonian restoration of Independence. He was also the chair of the Estonian Left Party from 1995 to 1996.

Eller graduated from Kärdla Secondary School in 1958, from the Law Faculty at the University of Tartu in 1973, and in 1981 from Leningrad Communist University.

He worked in the Sports Federation of Power in Hiiumaa from 1958 to 1964. From 1964 to 1970, he was the secretary of the Hiuumaa branch of the Central Committee of the Leninist Young Communist League of Estonia (ELKNÜ), and from 1966 to 1972 he was a member of the Central Committee of ELKNÜ. From 1970 to 1972, he was chairman of the Hiiumaa People's Control Commission. From 1970 to 1972, he was the head of the fishery farm of Hiiu Kalur.

Awards
2002: 5th Class of the Estonian Order of the National Coat of Arms (received 23 February 2002)
2006: 3rd Class of the Estonian Order of the National Coat of Arms (received 23 February 2006)

References

1939 births
2010 deaths
People from Kärdla
Communist Party of Estonia politicians
Members of the Supreme Soviet of the Estonian Soviet Socialist Republic, 1985–1990
Voters of the Estonian restoration of Independence
Estonian male long-distance runners
University of Tartu alumni
Recipients of the Order of the National Coat of Arms, 3rd Class
Recipients of the Order of the National Coat of Arms, 5th Class